The desert box turtle, also known as the Sonoran box turtle, (Terrapene ornata luteola) is a subspecies of box turtle which is endemic to the southwestern United States and northern Mexico. They are generally terrestrial but occasionally take to the water and are most known for their boxy shell and its structural integrity. The desert box turtles are most active in late June or early July into early October, with greatest activity in July and August.

Features 
The most obvious morphological feature of box turtles is their bony boxy shell that consists of scutes covering the carapace. The scutes are used to enhance structural support and give the box turtles their sculpted appearance. In box turtles, the bones in their shell fuse together unlike in other turtles. Their ribs and vertebral column are fused with their bony shell.

The box turtle also has the ability to create a tight seal by closing the plastron upward to fit snugly against the carapace through a movable hinge between its pectoral and abdominal structures assuring the closure of the shell (Figure 1).

Other characteristics include a continuous middorsal yellow line on its carapace and the plastron is solid brown with yellow spots and has mottling on its head and legs. Although, some males can have an entirely green head. Their colors are muted for camouflage in the desert and mature turtles are lighter and more muted than the juvenile. Most, but not all male turtles have red irises.
Male box turtles also include concave plastrons, thicker tails with the cloaca closer to the tip, and longer rear legs with larger curved claws which are used to grip the female shell during mating. They also have a similar internal anatomy to freshwater turtles except for the fact that they lack a degenerative cloacal bursae because they do not need to hibernate in water.

Most adults have about a 125–130 mm carapace length, in where the females were significantly longer than males. It has also been seen that the number of years they can live up to is between 30 and 40 years old.

Geographic range
The desert box turtle ranges across the plain of central North America west to the foothills of the Rocky Mountains and south to Northern Mexico and South Texas. They are commonly found in the southwestern area, including much of New Mexico, the Trans-Pecos region of Texas or the “Big Bend” region of Texas, Southeastern Arizona, and south into Sonora and Chihuahua in Mexico. They have relatively small home ranges and exhibit strong site fidelity, meaning that they always seem to attempt a return to their site of origin.

Habitat
The desert box turtle is endemic to the southwestern United States and northern Mexico. It lives in desert grasslands/shrublands and may face a drier, more severe environment compared with other box turtles in North America. They prefer arid, open prairie areas but have also been found in grassland regions where there is an abundance of yucca around. They prefer small defined areas where they can be well aware of their surroundings and the locations of their food, shelter and overwintering sites.

Breeding habitat
Desert box turtles usually prefer wet springs where egg production is higher compared to dry springs where a smaller proportion of females produce eggs. Spring rains may increase the proportion of females laying eggs in the summer and in years with dry springs, turtles may defer laying eggs completely rather than reducing annual out. Because of the seasonal droughts, it is possible that growth and reproductive patterns of desert box turtles differ from species found in central North America.

Hibernation
Desert box turtles hibernate in the winter and are naturally freeze tolerant. This is due to the fact that they are greatly affected by air temperature and the weather. As soon as November hits, hibernation begins and lasts until late May and early June. They usually hibernate at temperatures between 1 and 15 degrees, the desert box turtles have designated overwintering or hibernation sites that are closely within their home range. The desert box turtles burrow themselves into the ground for about 35 cm with their hind sticking out. They stay burrowed until the temperature increases and certain factors like warming of the ground temperature, precipitation and ground moisture are present. They attain a 5-month dormancy until they emerge and become active again.

Reproduction
Their overall activity when it comes to mating or laying eggs is completely correlated to the air temperature and not the precipitation. Male desert box turtles are normally sexually mature by the time they are 8–9 years of age, but in captivity have been known to breed as young at the age 2. Females normally require 10–11 years to reach sexual maturity and their breeding season lasts between March and May, and nesting sites will be chosen from May to July. Males will be sexually active from the time they emerge from hibernation until September or October. Males often fight aggressively with other males over females when looking for a mate. The mean number of eggs in a clutch varied from 2.67 to 3.55, there was no indication of multiple clutches being produced, and variation in egg numbers was only weakly explained by the cloaca of the female. Clutch size was positively correlated with the maternal body size, but egg width was not related to the maternal body size but was related to the maternal mass. Pelvic width was significantly correlated with the egg width and maternal body size. Egg size varied very little while incubation lasted about seventy days.

Diet
Desert box turtles are omnivores, eating native vegetation that surrounds their habitat and also eating insects and smaller animals. Considering that they inhabit plain grasslands or mesquite grasslands, their diet consists of largely ground-living insects that include grasshoppers, beetles and caterpillars. The one important element in their diet are dung beetles and they are in exploitable quantities due to great numbers of herbivores in the population. As the population of dung beetles’ decreases, the number of box turtles decreases with it as well.

Conservation
Box turtles in North America are increasingly becoming a conservation concern because of habitat loss and because they are being harvested for the pet trade. The destruction of prairies due to land renovations has led to the decline of the desert box turtles (Terrapene ornata luteola) across much of their geographical range. These sites showed high fidelity and were used for overwintering habitats. But efforts have been placed by land management organizations by considering the use of translocation programs in order to restore the desert box turtle's population to areas specifically reserved for them. But they are faced with the problem of long term post-translocation monitoring because they have to establish new home ranges that are unfamiliar to the box turtles. Plus, they are notorious for returning to their site of origin and have very small home ranges where they exhibit high fidelity and used it as overwintering sites.

References

Further reading 
 van Dijk, P.P. and Hammerson, G.A. (2011) Terrapene ornata. IUCN Red List of Threatened Species. Archived online 9 June 2018.
 http://www.reptilefact.com/dmca-take-down-notice. (2018). Ornate Box Turtle Range. Archived online 9 June 2018

External links 

ITIS Standard Report Page
Information from the Arizona Sonoran Desert Museum
Closeup photo of four-year-old male Desert Box Turtle

Reptiles of the United States
Reptiles of Mexico
Fauna of the Sonoran Desert
Terrapene
Fauna of the Chihuahuan Desert